CIMJ-FM (106.1 MHz, Magic 106), is a Canadian hot adult contemporary radio station based in Guelph, Ontario, in the Kitchener-Waterloo market. Its sister station is CJOY. Their studios are located at 75 Speedvale Ave East and its transmitter is located in Puslinch, between the Waterloo Region and Guelph.

History
 16 May 1968: CRTC approves an application by CJOY Ltd. to operate a new FM station in Guelph. The initial studio and office address is 50 Wyndham Street.
 1 July 1969: CJOY-FM begins its first broadcasts. It is authorised for 106.1 MHz frequency, 50 000 watts effective radiated power and 75.9 metres (249 ft) antenna height.
 26 July 1972: CJOY-FM and its associated AM station (CJOY) are authorised to relocate their common offices and studios to 75 Speedvale Avenue East and have remained there since.
 1975: CJOY-FM calls sign changes to CKLA-FM.
 1977: CJOY Ltd. assumes at least partial ownership of AM station CFTJ in Cambridge.
 1980: CRTC approves relocation of both the CJOY AM and FM transmitters.
 28 April 1987: Kawartha Broadcasting Co. Ltd. purchases CJOY Ltd. (CKLA-FM and CJOY), including the associated Galt Broadcasting company which operates the Cambridge station formerly known as CFTJ (whose call sign became CIAM in 1987).
 1989: CKLA-FM's owners now known as Power Broadcasting.
 10 July 1992: The station's call letters are now CIMJ-FM, but begins to identify itself as Magic 106.1. The station format changes from easy listening to adult contemporary, featuring music from the 1970s to the 1990s.
 29 August 1996: CRTC renews CIMJ-FM licence until 2003
 2 June 1995: Station co-founder Wally Slatter dies.
 February 1996: Station co-founder Fred Metcalf dies.
 24 March 2000: CRTC approves sale of Power Broadcasting radio stations to Corus Radio, including CJOY-AM and CIMJ-FM
 13 April 2000: Corus purchase of Power Broadcasting radio properties is completed.
 July 2003: The station shifted to its present hot adult contemporary format after CIZN dropped its format and changed frequencies.
 September 2007: Major studio renovations begin.
 August 2008: Studios are completed and are on an AES 44.1 digital network. Digital audio is stored and played back uncompressed.

References

External links
 Magic 106
 
 

Imj
Imj
Imj
Radio stations established in 1968
1968 establishments in Ontario